Hitchcock Independent School District is a public school district based in Hitchcock, Texas (USA). In addition to Hitchcock, the district serves parts of La Marque (including Delaney Cove)  Tiki Island and the Saltgrass Crossing Subdivision.

In 2009, the school district was rated "academically acceptable" by the Texas Education Agency.

Hitchcock ISD 2015- 2016 accountability Rating according to the Texas Education Agency is IMPROVEMENT REQUIRED.

Hitchcock ISD received a warning for LOW ACCOUNTABILITY marks in 2011 and 2013.

Schools
Hitchcock High School (Grades 9-12)
Crosby Middle School (Grades 6-8)
Stewart Elementary School (Grades 3-5)
Hitchcock Primary (Grades PK-2)

References

External links
 

School districts in Galveston County, Texas